Eurhadina is a genus of leafhoppers belonging to the family Cicadellidae.

The genus was first described by Hermann Haupt in 1929.

The species of this genus are found in Eurasia.

Species:
 Eurhadina concinna
 Eurhadina pulchella

References

Cicadellidae genera
Typhlocybini